This is a list of Nepalese films that were scheduled to be released in 2019.

January – March

April – June

July–September

October–December

References 

2019

2019 in Nepal